Heather A. Berlin is an American neuroscientist and licensed clinical psychologist noted for her work in science communication and science outreach. Her research focuses on brain-behavior relationships affecting the prevention and treatment of impulsive and compulsive psychiatric disorders. She is also interested in the neural basis of consciousness, dynamic unconscious processes, and creativity. Berlin is host of the PBS series Science Goes to the Movies, the international Discovery Channel series Superhuman Showdown, and StarTalk All-Stars with Neil DeGrasse Tyson.

Education and early life
Berlin was born in New York City to a Jewish family. She received her doctorate in experimental psychology/neuropsychology from University of Oxford, where she was a student at Magdalen College, Oxford, and her Master of Public Health from Harvard University specializing in psychiatric epidemiology and health care management/policy. Berlin earned her Master's in psychology from The New School for Social Research and Bachelor of Science from Stony Brook University.

Career and research
Berlin is an Associate Clinical Professor of Psychiatry and Neuroscience at Icahn School of Medicine at Mount Sinai in New York City, where she was also a National Institute of Mental Health postdoctoral fellow in psychiatry working on compulsive, impulsive, personality, and anxiety disorders. She trained in clinical neuropsychology at Weill Cornell Medicine in the Department of Neurological Surgery, and is a visiting scholar at the New York Psychoanalytic Society and Institute. She was a Visiting Assistant Professor at Vassar College, and a visiting lecturer at the Swiss Federal Institute of Technology in Zurich, and at the Hebrew University of Jerusalem. Berlin's research has been published in American Journal of Psychiatry, Journal of Personality Disorders, Psychiatry Research, Brain, and Scientific American among others.

Passionate about science communication, destigmatizing mental illness, and promoting women in STEM, Berlin is a committee member of the National Academy of Sciences’ Science and Entertainment Exchange, and on the inaugural committee of the National Academies’ Eric and Wendy Schmidt Awards for Excellence in Science Communication. She has also served on the American Association for the Advancement of Science's (AAAS) Technology Engagement with the Public (CoSTEP), and The New York Times series TimesTalks.

She co-wrote and starred in the critically acclaimed off-Broadway and Edinburgh Fringe Festival show, Off the Top, about the neuroscience of improvisation, and the Edinburgh Fringe Festival show, Impulse Control. Berlin has made numerous media appearances including on the History Channel, Netflix (Chelsea Does Drugs with Chelsea Handler, and The Mind, Explained), Discovery Channel, BBC World Service, StarTalk Radio with Neil deGrasse Tyson, Big Think, Bill Nye: Science Guy documentary film, Curious Minds and One World with Deepak Chopra, StoryCollider and TEDx.

Awards and honors
Berlin has been the recipient of numerous awards and fellowships including a Young Investigator Award from the American Neuropsychiatric Association, a Young Investigator Award from the National Education Alliance for Borderline Personality Disorder, and the Clifford Yorke Prize from the International Neuropsychoanalysis Society. She won the 2015 BBC2 Christmas University Challenge as part of the Magdalen College, Oxford team.

Personal life
Berlin has a daughter, born in November 2013, and a son, born in November 2016.

References

Living people
Alumni of Magdalen College, Oxford
Harvard School of Public Health alumni
The New School alumni
Stony Brook University alumni
New York University staff
Vassar College faculty
State University of New York faculty
Jewish American scientists
Year of birth missing (living people)
People from New York City
21st-century American Jews